Bill Myerscough (22 June 1930 in Bolton, Lancashire – 16 March 1977) was an English professional footballer who played in the Football League for six clubs. He was in the Aston Villa side that won the 1957 FA Cup Final.

Playing career
An inside forward, Myerscough began his professional career at the relatively late age of 24 when he joined Walsall from Ashfield in time for the 1954–55 season. He spent a season with the Saddlers before joining Football League First Division side Aston Villa, where he went on to make 64 league appearances over the next four years.

The highlight though came in the 1957 FA Cup Final, when Villa denied Manchester United a First Division and FA Cup double with a 2–1 victory. Unfortunately the following season ended in relegation and Myerscough spent a season with Rotherham United before joining Coventry City in July 1960.

In March 1962, Myerscough joined Chester, who were destined to finish bottom of the Fourth Division. Myerscough made his debut alongside fellow new signing Ron Hewitt in a 5–1 defeat at York City on 3 March 1962 and ended the season with three goals from 13 games. He featured in half the league games the following season and then moved to Wrexham in exchange for Stan Bennion and George Evans. After a season with Wrexham, Myerscough ended his professional career and joined non-league side Macclesfield Town. He died in 1977.

Honours

Aston Villa

 FA Cup winners: 1956–57.

External links
Coventry City movie film featuring Myerscough

References

1930 births
1977 deaths
Footballers from Bolton
English footballers
Association football inside forwards
English Football League players
Ashfield F.C. players
Walsall F.C. players
Aston Villa F.C. players
Rotherham United F.C. players
Coventry City F.C. players
Chester City F.C. players
Wrexham A.F.C. players
Macclesfield Town F.C. players
FA Cup Final players